João Gomes (born 12 July 1975) is a Portuguese fencer. He competed in the individual foil events at the 2000 and 2004 Summer Olympics.

References

External links
 

1975 births
Living people
Portuguese male foil fencers
Olympic fencers of Portugal
Fencers at the 2000 Summer Olympics
Fencers at the 2004 Summer Olympics
Sportspeople from Lisbon